Alvar-e Sofla (also Romanized as Alvār-e Soflá, Alvār Soflá, and Alvar-e Soflá; also known as Alvār, Alvār Ashāqī, Alvār Bozorg, Alvār-e Pā’īn, Alvār Pā’īn, and Bol’shoy Al’var) is a village in Aji Chay Rural District, in the Central District of Tabriz County, East Azerbaijan Province, Iran. At the 2006 census, its population was 3,567, in 846 families.

References 

Populated places in Tabriz County